My Guardian Angels (Chinese: 单翼天使) is a Singaporean drama produced and telecast on Mediacorp Channel 8. It stars Zoe Tay, Kym Ng, Pierre Png and Hong Ling. The series has received criticism for its portrayal of LGBTQ characters.

The series was the most-watched local Chinese drama series in Singapore in 2020. For her role in the drama, Tay won the Star Awards for Best Actress for the fourth time in her career, making her the first person to have won the award four times.

Cast

Main
Zoe Tay as Mandy See
Kym Ng as Wu Miaomiao
Pierre Png as Su Dong Yu
Hong Ling as Ye Si Jin

Supporting
 Edwin Goh
 Benjamin Tan
 Chen Tianwen
 Fang Rong
 Jin Yinji
 Brandon Wong
 Ivan Lo Kai Jun
 Chen Junhe

Guest and minor
 Peter Yu
 Regene Lim
 Liang Tian
 Natalie Mae Tan
 Chase Tan
 Hazelle Teo
 Marcus Mok
 Cassandra See
 Joy Yak
 Bernard Tan
 Adele Wong
 Wallace Ang

Controversy
A sub-plot involving a paedophilic gay basketball coach who had a sexually transmitted disease portrayed by Chase Tan was criticised by the LGBT community in Singapore for perpetuating the stereotype that gay men are paedophiles and have sexually transmitted diseases. The sub-plot was condemned by Action For Aids, a Singaporean non-governmental organisation "dedicated to fighting HIV/AIDS infection", who stated that "The portrayal of gay men as paedophiles further perpetuates falsehoods that create further suffering among an already marginalised and stigmatised population." A second sub-plot involving parents, portrayed by Kym Ng and Brandon Wong, worrying about the sexual orientation of their son, portrayed by Benjamin Tan, and behaving in a homophobic manner, was also criticised.

In response to the critism, Mediacorp issued an apology, stating that it had "no intention to disrespect or discriminate against the LGBTQ community in the drama". A spokesperson for the company stated that the first sub-plot was meant to "encourage young people to be aware of potential dangers and not be afraid to speak up and protect themselves", and that the second sub-plot was meant to " depict the real life struggles some parents face in communicating with their children on topics such as relationships and sexual orientation".

References

2020s Singaporean television series
2020 Singaporean television series debuts
2020 Singaporean television series endings
Mediacorp Chinese language programmes